Paul B. Jaskot (born 1963) is a historian and professor at Duke University. His research interests include architectural history, urban planning, and Nazi Germany.

Works

References

Duke University faculty
1963 births
Living people
American architectural historians
Historians of Germany
American art historians
Northwestern University alumni